The Hyde Park Picture House is a cinema and Grade II listed building in the Hyde Park area of Leeds, West Yorkshire, England. Built by Thomas Winn & Sons, it opened on 7 November 1914. It features many original features, such as an ornate balcony and external box office, and is the only remaining gaslit cinema in the United Kingdom. Following the installation of "comfier seating", the Picture House has a capacity of 275, down from around 587 on opening.

After being threatened with closure in 1989, the cinema was taken over by Leeds City Council, who created the Grand Theatre and Opera House Limited, an independent company within the council which looks after the Picture House along with the Grand Theatre and Opera House and the City Varieties. An initial National Lottery grant was awarded in 2016 to partly fund a restoration of the building, build a cafe, improve accessibility and add a second screen in the basement. Planning permission was approved in June 2018 and a £2.3 million National Lottery grant was awarded in January 2019 to pay for the project. Following delays due to the COVID-19 pandemic, work is now scheduled to begin in April 2021.

A varied programme plays at the cinema, from arthouse movies to big new releases. This bill attracts a varied crowd of local residents and students. The Leeds International Film Festival began at the venue in 1987.

As well as showing movies, the cinema hosts occasional musical performances and has been used as both a backdrop for films and TV programmes and as a wedding venue.

History 

Hyde Park Picture House was designed by architects Thomas Winn & Sons in 1906. It was originally built for Leeds hotel businessman Henry Child, who owned The Mitre hotel in Leeds City Centre, however Leeds Corporation repeatedly rejected his application to transfer his license to his proposed new hotel, The Paragon, and the building was therefore modified to become Brudenell Road Social & Recreation Club, being converted to a cinema in 1913. It stands around halfway down Brudenell Road at the junction with Queen's Road, on a canted corner. The front elevation is topped by a Dutch gable with ball finials and features four ionic columns made from white Burmantofts Marmo. Glazed terracotta dressings and a frieze with moulded letters spelling out "Hyde Park Picture House" appear at the entrance and contrast with the red brick, which makes up the majority of the building.

The 587-seat cinema opened shortly after the start of World War I, on 7 November 1914. An advertisement in the Yorkshire Evening Post at the time of the opening, branded Hyde Park Picture House the "cosiest in Leeds". Their Only Son, billed as a "patriotic drama", was the first film shown at the venue, while other morale-boosting releases, such as An Englishman's Home, and newsreels delivering reports from the frontlines to families back home, made up the majority of the Picture House's programme during the Great War.

Following the advent of "talkies" in the 1920s, the cinema was converted for sound.

With a general decline in cinema audiences the cinema closed in the early 1950s then opened again. In 1959, to promote the showing of The Big Hunt, a live elephant appeared outside the cinema. At some point after this, the Picture House briefly closed and became a bingo hall before reopening as a cinema again in 1962, after refurbishment and installation of new projectors, with a programme successfully catering to the growing student population in the area.

In 1984, the private charitable company "Friends of Hyde Park Picture House" was set up to support the cinema and help preserve it as "an important part of our cinema and cultural heritage as well as ensuring it is maintained as an available public asset to the audiences of Hyde Park, Leeds, Yorkshire and the UK". Members of the Friends receive discounted admission to the cinema and funds from membership go towards supporting the charity's aims. Three years later, in 1987, the Leeds International Film Festival began at the venue.

When the Picture House was threatened with closure in 1989, Leeds City Council stepped in to save it, creating an independent company within the council, the Grand Theatre and Opera House Limited, to preserve the cinema alongside two other Leeds venues: the Grand Theatre and Opera House and the City Varieties.

The Picture House was given Grade II listed status on 11 September 1996. The ornate gas lamp outside the cinema was separately Grade-II listed on the same date.

Present day 

Along with Cottage Road, the Hyde Park Picture House is one of only two surviving original single-screen cinemas in Leeds, down from peak numbers of between 60 and 70 in the 1930s. The Picture House retains many original features, including an external ticket booth, decorated barrel-vaulted ceiling and balcony adorned with a frieze of plaster festoons, brackets and shields. It is also the only cinema in the UK to retain "modesty" gas lights, designed to avoid complete darkness in the auditorium. The original screen, painted directly on the wall and surrounded by golden cherubs, remains intact behind its modern successor.

The cinema has seen several changes since it opened in 1914, notably a reduction in the capacity of the auditorium from 587 on opening to 275, following the installation of "comfier" seating, with the present seats having been salvaged from the Lounge cinema in Headingley after its closure in 2005. The Cinemeccanica Victoria 8 projectors also came from the Lounge, while the clock to the right of the screen was taken from the former Gaumont cinema, which occupied the building now used by the O2 Academy Leeds. The fireplace, which originally sat in the hallway, has been replaced by a kiosk.

In 2016 the cinema was awarded an initial National Lottery grant of £122,000 to explore conservation work and an expansion of the venue. It was announced that the money would be used to restore the building, including the terrazzo foyer floor and gas lights; build a cafe/bar so that customers no longer have to queue outside; install disabled toilets and improve accessibility; add a second screen in the basement; and make the cinema's archives available to the public alongside educational workshops, tours and archival screenings. Planning permission for the project was approved in June 2018, and a further National Lottery grant of £2.3 million was confirmed in January 2019. The work, dubbed the Picture House Project, is costed at £3.6 million and, with additional funding from the Garfield Weston Foundation and Leeds City Council, was scheduled to begin at the end of February 2020. The COVID-19 pandemic caused delays to the Picture House Project but, with a £285,600 Capital Kickstart Fund award from the National Lottery Heritage Fund and the UK government's Culture Recovery Fund, an announcement was made in February 2021 that work would commence in April of the same year.

The Picture House plays an eclectic programme of films, from arthouse and independent movies to big new releases. Along with regular double bills and annual Christmas showings of It's a Wonderful Life, the cinema also hosts "Bring Your Own Baby (BYOB)" events, for children and their parents or carers, featuring lower volumes, subtitles and raised light levels. This mixed bill attracts a varied audience of local residents, graduates and students at the cities universities and "not just Guardian readers".

Actors, such as Paddy Considine, Masanobu Ando and Adam Buxton, have been interviewed at the cinema and film critic Mark Kermode has hosted several question and answer sessions. Kermode is a "champion" of the Picture House, describing it in his book The Good, the Bad and the Multiplex, as "a beauty; a proper old-fashioned picture palace" with a clientele that are "enthusiastic, attentive and apparently more interested in films than in their mobile phones".

Other uses 

The Hyde Park Picture House has been used as a backdrop in many films and TV programmes, including the feature-length TV drama A Is for Acid, the Vanessa Redgrave film Wetherby and the two-part BBC One TV film The Great Train Robbery. It has also been used as a wedding venue.

Occasional musical performances take place at the Picture House, with John Parish and Trembling Bells among those who have played.

Footnotes

See also 

 Architecture of Leeds
 Listed buildings in Leeds (Headingley Ward)

References

Bibliography

External links 

 
 
 

Buildings and structures in Leeds
Cinemas in Yorkshire
Grade II listed buildings in West Yorkshire
Listed buildings in Leeds
Movie palaces
1914 establishments in England